Shave the Planet is the ninth album by the Huntington Beach, California punk rock band Guttermouth, released in 2006 by Volcom Entertainment. It continued the band's style of fast, abrasive punk rock with tongue-in-cheek humor and sarcastic lyrics. The album was their first to feature drummer Ryan Farrell, and also marked the return of founding bassist Clint Weinrich, and was the final album to feature founding member Scott Sheldon and guitarist of four years Don Horne.

Track listing
All songs written by Guttermouth
"Shave the Planet"
"Capitalizing from Plump Mistakes"
"My Chemical Imbalance"
"Flacidism"
"Primate Camp"
"The 23 Things That Rhyme with Darby Crash"
Mark' the Cubby Chaser/Newport Sweater Fat"
"What Then"
"God, Steve McQueen 'The Work Song'"
"Upside Down Space Cockroach"

Performers
Mark Adkins – vocals
Scott Sheldon – guitar
Donald "Don" Horne – guitar
Clint Weinrich  – bass
Ryan Farrell – drums
Jim Susoeff and David V. – backing vocals

Album information
Record label: Volcom Entertainment
Recorded and mixed by Scott Sheldon and Donald Horne at the Volcom Boathouse
Produced by Scott Sheldon and Donald Horne
Mastered by Gene Grimaldi
Art and layout by Ryan Immegart, based on concept by Mark Adkins

Guttermouth albums
2006 albums
Volcom Entertainment albums